Giulia Guarino or Julia Guarino Fiechter (born 17 July 1897; died 31 July 1985) was an Italian/Uruguayan architect. 
She was the first Latin American woman to graduate with a degree in architecture in 1923.

She was depicted on a stamp in Uruguay.

References

External links

1897 births
1985 deaths
Uruguayan people of Italian descent
20th-century Uruguayan architects
20th-century Italian architects
Italian women architects
20th-century Italian women
Italian emigrants to Uruguay